The following is a list of most watched Brazil television broadcasts of 2020.

Most watched by week

See also 

 Television in Brazil
 List of most watched Brazil television broadcasts of 2019

References

Television in Brazil
Brazilian television-related lists
2020 in Brazilian television